Dancing in the Dust or Ball in the Dust (original title Bal Poussière)  is a 1988 Ivorian film dealing with themes of polygyny. It was directed by Henri Duparc, and starring actors (Bamba Bakary, Hanny Tchelly, Naky Sy Savanne, Thérèse Taba, and Anne Kabou. In July 2021, the film was shown in the Cannes Classics section at the 2021 Cannes Film Festival.

Synopsis
Demi-Dieu (Demigod) is a wealthy farmer and village head with five wives. When he decides to marry a sixth, young Binta, to have one for each day of the week (apart from Sunday, the day of rest), his five wives become discontent. Binta, a modern, self-confident woman, doesn't want to be kept in line. Soon there is conflict with her husband as well as with the other five wives, creating comic relief.

References

External links
 

Ivorian comedy films
1988 films